Nguyên Bình is a rural district of Cao Bằng province in the Northeast region of Vietnam. As of 2003 the district had a population of 39,153. The district covers an area of 837 km². The district capital lies at Nguyên Bình.

Administrative divisions
Nguyên Bình District consists of the state capital, Nguyên Bình, and 19 communes: Tĩnh Túc, Thịnh Vượng, Hoa Thám, Lang Môn, Tam Kim, Hưng Đạo, Quang Thành, Thành Công, Phan Thanh, Mai Long, Ca Thành, Vũ Nông, Yên Lạc, Triệu Nguyên, Thể Dục, Thái Học, Minh Thanh, Bắc Hợp and Minh Tâm.

References

Districts of Cao Bằng province